= Batkachny Island =

Batkachny Island Баткачный
- Island
- Location within Caspian Sea
- Coordinates: 45°43′N 48°26′E
- Country: Russia
- Oblast: Astrakhan Oblast

Batkachny Island (Russian: Баткачный) is an island in the Caspian Sea. It is located right off the mouths of the Volga in an area where there are many delta islands.

Batkachny Island has a very twisted shape, with many headlands and inlets. It is separated from the coast by a 1 km wide channel. It has a length of almost 30 km and a maximum width of 10 km.

== Adjacent Islands ==
- Sedmoy Island (Ostrov Sed'moy) 45°47′N 48°32′E lies about 7 km to the NE.
- Nizhny Island (Ostrov Nizhny), also known as 'Nizhny Oseredok' 45°43′N 48°30′E lies right east of Batkachny Island's eastern coast, separated from it by a channel that has an average width of 1 km.
- Maly Setnoy Island (Ostrov Malyy Setnoy)45°41′N 48°39′E lies 10 km to the east of Batkachny.
- Morskoy Setnoy Island (Ostrov Morskoy Setnoy) lies 15 km to the east, beyond Malyy Setnoy.
- Other nearby islands include Ostrov Zelenen'ky and Ostrov Zelyony

Administratively Batkachny and its neighboring islands belong to the Astrakhan Oblast of the Russian Federation.
